Josef Plamínek (born 12 June 1954) is a Czech rower. He competed for Czechoslovakia at the 1976 Summer Olympics and the 1980 Summer Olympics.

References

External links
 
 

1954 births
Living people
Czech male rowers
Olympic rowers of Czechoslovakia
Rowers at the 1976 Summer Olympics
Rowers at the 1980 Summer Olympics
Sportspeople from Ústí nad Labem